The Yunnan Nationalities Museum is located on the east bank of Dianchi Lake in Kunming, Yunnan, China, next to the Yunnan Ethnic Village. Completed in 1995, it is a comprehensive ethnology museum. Covering an area of over 200 mu, the museum has a building area of 130,000 square meters. It consists of various exhibition halls, office building, report hall, storage and workshops. The ecological environment, religious customs, culture and arts and relics of the ethnic groups of Yunnan are collected in it. The 120,000 items of objects fall into the 16 categories such as ethnic groups, dresses and personal adornment, technique, arts, ecology, ancient books, and strange stones etc.

See also
 List of museums in China

References
 https://web.archive.org/web/20111004080601/http://www.chinakunming.travel/show.aspx?aid=4631

External links
 

Museums in Kunming
Ethnographic museums in Asia
Folk museums in China
National first-grade museums of China